This list of sibling pairs includes certain twins, provided they have at least one additional older or younger sibling. Siblings are arranged alphabetically by last name; listed from oldest to youngest.

A
 Ben and Casey Affleck; actor/director/producer/writer and actor, respectively
 Marv, Steve and Al Albert; sportscasters
 Mabel and Jack Albertson; actors
 Muhammad and Rahman Ali; professional boxers
 Phylicia Rashad and Debbie Allen; actresses (Debbie is also a singer, dancer and choreographer)
 Gregg and Duane Allman; musicians
 Don and Jim Ameche; actors
 Dana Andrews and Steve Forrest; actors
 Claude and Nicolas Anelka; French footballer and agent
 Natalie and Nicole Appleton; singers, members of All Saints
 Lucie Arnaz and Desi Arnaz, Jr.; actor-singer and actor-musician, respectively (children of Desi Arnaz and Lucille Ball)
 James Arness and Peter Graves; actors
 Stefan and Alison Arngrim; actors; children of actress Norma MacMillan and talent manager Thor Arngrim
 Patricia, David, Rosanna and Alexis Arquette; actors
 Ron and Scott Asheton; musicians, members of The Stooges
 Adele and Fred Astaire; actors, singers, dancers
 Sean and Mackenzie Astin; actors, sons of actors Patty Duke and John Astin
Dan and Peter Aykroyd; actors and comedians

B
 Wilhelm Friedemann, Carl Philipp Emanuel, Johann Christoph Friedrich and Johann Christian; sons of Johann Sebastian Bach who also had musical careers
 Francis Edward Bache, composer and musician; Walter Bache, pianist and conductor and Constance Bache, composer, pianist and teacher.
 Kevin and Michael Bacon; actor and composer-musician, respectively
 John and Mary Badham; motion picture-director and actress, respectively
 Dan and Dragoș Balauru; Romanian footballers
 Alec, Daniel, William and Stephen Baldwin; actors
 Lionel, Ethel and John Barrymore; actors
 Justine and Jason Bateman; actors
 Shirley MacLaine and Warren Beatty; actors
 Noah Beery Sr. and Wallace Beery; actors
 Howard and David Bellamy; musicians
 Robert and Ronald Bell; musicians, members of Kool & The Gang 
 John and James Belushi; actors, comedians
 Constance and Joan Bennett; actresses
 Jonas, Malin and Jenny Berggren; musicians, founding members of Ace of Base
 Peter Billingsley and Melissa Michaelsen; actors
 Brian and Scott Bloom; actors and Mike Bloom; musician
 Flesh and Layzie Bone; rappers, members of Bone Thugs-n-Harmony
 Edwin and John Wilkes Booth; actors
 Ben and Eric Bostrom; motorcycle racers
 Timothy, Joseph, Sam and Ben Bottoms; actors
 Nadia and Lili Boulanger; composer/pedagogue and composer, respectively
 Larry and Laurent Bourgeois; French dancers and choreographers known as Les Twins
 Elizabeth and Lorraine Bracco; actresses
 Jocelyn and Marlon Brando; actors
 Nicholas Brendon and Kelly Donovan; actors, identical twins
 Spencer and Abigail Breslin; actors
 Beau and Jeff Bridges; actors, sons of actor Lloyd Bridges
 Jay Briscoe and Mark Briscoe; professional wrestlers, real surname Pugh
 Charlotte, Emily and Anne Brontë; authors
 Sandra and Gesine Bullock-Prado; actress and pastry chef, respectively
 Pavel and Valeri Bure; hockey players
 Kurt and Kyle Busch; NASCAR Sprint Cup Race Drivers
 George (43rd President of the United States), Jeb (former Florida governor), Neil (businessman), Marvin (businessman) and Dorothy Bush (author); children of former U. S. President George H. W. Bush and First Lady Barbara Bush

C
 James and Jeanne Cagney; actors
 Kirk and Candace Cameron; actors
 Joseph and Frank Campanella; actors
 Christian and Neve Campbell; actors
 Richard and Karen Carpenter; musicians, singers
 John Carradine (father to) Bruce Carradine (adopted son of John's first wife), David Carradine, (actor, movies and TV series Kung Fu), Christopher Carradine (Vice President of Walt Disney Engineering), Keith Carradine (actor, movies, TV series Dexter) and Robert Carradine (actor, movies, TV series King of the Nerds)
 Peter and Kitty Carruthers; figure-skaters
 Nick and Aaron Carter; singers
 Veronica and Angela Cartwright; actresses 
 Gerald and Bob Casale; musicians, members of Devo
 David, musician/actor and half-brothers, Shaun, Patrick and Ryan Cassidy; musician/actor/director, actors; sons of actor Jack Cassidy; all but David, also son's of actress Shirley Jones
 Sydney and Charlie Chaplin; actor and actor-filmmaker-composer, respectively
 Bobby and Jack Charlton; English footballers
 Maksim and Valentin Chmerkovskiy; dancers
 Steve and Jimmy Clark of The Clark Brothers; tap dancers
 Joel and Ethan Coen; filmmakers
 Bootsy and Catfish Collins; musicians 
 Joan and Jackie Collins; actress and novelist, respectively
 Sean and Neil Connery; actors
 Roman and Sofia Coppola; filmmakers, children of Francis Ford and Eleanor Coppola
 Francis Ford Coppola and Talia Shire
 Macaulay, Kieran and Rory Culkin; actors
 Chris and Andrew Cuomo; news anchor and politician, respectively
 Sondra, Cherie, and Marie Currie; actresses; Cherie and Marie - musicians, singers, artists, authors; daughters of actress Marie Harmon
 Stephen and Seth Curry; basketball players
 Sinéad, Sorcha, Niamh, and Catherine Cusack; actors, children of Cyril and Maureen Cusack
 Ann, Joan and John Cusack; actors
 Trace, Miley and Noah Cyrus; singers

D
 Tyne and Tim Daly; actors
 Ray Davies and Dave Davies; musicians, members of The Kinks
 Tamasin and Daniel Day-Lewis; chef/food critic and actor, respectively
 Bunny, Bobby, Tommy, Randy, Mark, El, James and Chico DeBarge; musicians and singers,
 Dizzy and Daffy Dean; baseball players
 Vance and Ellen DeGeneres; actors
 Dalvin DeGrate and DeVante Swing; musicians, members of Jodeci
 Olivia de Havilland and Joan Fontaine; actresses
 Emily and Zooey Deschanel; actresses, daughters of cinematographer Caleb Deschanel
 Donna de Varona and Joanna Kerns; swimmer and actress, respectively
 Matt and Kevin Dillon; actors
 Dom and Joe DiMaggio; baseball players
 Magnus and Candida Doyle; musicians, members of Pulp
 Karin and Olof Dreijer; musicians, members of The Knife
 Mircea and Virgil Dridea; Romanian footballers
 Bismarck and Jannie du Plessis; South Africa international rugby players
 Hilary and Jacqueline du Pré; British flautist/memoirist and cellist, respectively
 Isabelle and Paul Duchesnay; World champion French ice dancers
 Haylie and Hilary Duff; singers, actresses
 Nora and Kevin Dunn; actors
 Griffin and Dominique Dunne; actors, children of author Dominick Dunne
 Eliza and Nate Dushku; actors

E
 Buddy and Vilma Ebsen; actors, dancers
 Bob Einstein (AKA Super Dave Osborne) and Albert Brooks; actors, comedians, writers, sons of Parkyakarkus
 Richard and Danny Elfman; filmmaker and film composer-member of Oingo Boingo, respectively
 Ezekiel, Rahm and Ari Emanuel; oncologist/bioethicist, politician, and talent agent, respectively
 Nora and Delia Ephron; writer/filmmaker and author/screenwriter, respectively
 Julius J. and Philip G. Epstein; screenwriters, identical twins
 Phil and Tony Esposito; hockey players
 Emilio Estevez, Charlie Sheen (born Carlos Estevez), Ramon Estevez and Renée Estevez; actors, directors, children of Martin Sheen (born Ramón Antonio Gerardo Estévez)
 Robin, Kevin and Duane Eubanks; jazz musicians
 Chris and Scott Evans; actors
 Max and Thom Evans; rugby players
 Don and Phil Everly, Everly Brothers

F
 Fred and Richard Fairbrass; musicians, singers, members of Right Said Fred
 Dakota and Elle Fanning; actresses
 Chris, Kevin and John P. Farley; comedians/actors
 Taissa and Vera Farmiga; actresses
 Josh and Zac Farro; ex-members of Paramore
 Mindy and Corey Feldman; singer-actors
 Ralph and Joseph Fiennes; actors
 Tim and Neil Finn; musicians, members of Split Enz and Crowded House
 Max and Dave Fleischer; animators
 Giovanna Fletcher and Mario Falcone; author and television personality, respectively
 Andy and Grant Flower; Zimbabwe cricketers
 Jane and Peter Fonda; actors, children of actor Henry Fonda
 Ben and Jon Foster; actor and musician/actor, respectively
 Buddy and Jodie Foster; actors
 Edward and James Fox; actors
 Emilia and Freddie Fox; actors, children of actor Edward Fox
 Laurence and Jack Fox; actors, sons of actor James Fox
 James, Tom and Dave Franco; actors 
 Lucian and Clement Freud; artist and politician/chef/broadcaster, respectively
 Soleil Moon Frye and Meenu Peluce, actors
 István and Lóránd Fülöp; Romanian footballers of Hungarian ethnicity

G

 Magda, Eva and Zsa-Zsa Gabor; actresses and socialites
 Noel and Liam Gallagher; musicians, members of Oasis
 Leif Garrett and Dawn Lyn; actors
 George and Ira Gershwin; composer and lyricist
 Barry, Robin, Maurice and Andy Gibb; musicians 
 Melissa, Jonathan and Sara Gilbert; actors
 Dorothy and Lillian Gish; actors
 Parry and Lloyd Glasspool; actor and tennis player, respectively
 Tracey and Missy Gold; actors
 Cuba and Omar Gooding; actors, sons of jazz musician Cuba Gooding Sr
 Ilene and Todd Graff; actors
 Heather and Aimee Graham; actresses
 Tony and Cammi Granato; ice hockey players
 Frankie and Ariana Grande; actors and singers
 Colin and Jonny Greenwood; musicians, members of Radiohead
 Melanie and Tracy Griffith; actresses, daughters of actress Tippi Hedren
 Wilhelm and Jacob Grimm; writers
 Michael and Mary Gross; actors
 Greg and Bryant Gumbel; television broadcasters
 Yuli and Lourdes Gurriel Jr.; Baseball Players
 Maggie and Jake Gyllenhaal; actors, children of Stephen Gyllenhaal
 Hank and John Green; novelists and YouTubers

H
 Gigi and Bella Hadid; models
 Cedric "K-Ci" and Joel "Jo-Jo" Hailey; musicians, members of K-Ci & JoJo and Jodeci
 Aaron and Damion Hall; singers, members of Guy
 Tom, Jim and Larry Hanks; actors, and entomologist respectively;
 Matt and Jeff Hardy – professional wrestlers (see also The Hardy Boyz)
 Wood and Steve Harris; actors
 Takanohana Kōji and Wakanohana Masaru; sumo wrestlers (real surname Hanada), sons of Takanohana I 
 Takanohana Kenshi and Wakanohana Kanji I; sumo wrestlers (real surname Hanada); former is father of the above pair
 Bret and Owen Hart - professional wrestlers
 Melissa Joan and Emily Hart; actresses
 Edwin and Walter Hawkins; gospel singers
 Franz Joseph and Michael Haydn; composers
 Murray and Anthony Head; actors
 Margaux and Mariel Hemingway; models, actresses, granddaughters of novelist Ernest Hemingway
 Luke, Chris and Liam Hemsworth; actors
 William and Caroline Herschel; musicians and astronomers
 Paris and Nicky Hilton; socialites
 Christopher and Peter Hitchens; authors, journalists
 Edwin and Aldis Hodge; actors
 Derek and Julianne Hough; dancers
 Ron and Clint Howard; actor-director and actor, respectively; sons of actors Jean and Rance Howard
 Shemp, Moe and Curly Howard, actors and vaudevillian comedians (real surname Horwitz); members of The Three Stooges
 Season and Whip Hubley; actors
 Kate and Oliver Hudson; actors
 Lane and Booker Huffman – professional wrestlers (see also Harlem Heat)
 Sarah and Emily Hughes; figure skaters
 Anjelica and Danny Huston; actress/director/producer and actor/writer/director, respectively (children of writer-director-actor John Huston)
 Sir Julian Huxley and Aldous Huxley; evolutionary biologist and novelist/philosopher, respectively

I
 James and Phillip Ingram; singers and musicians

J
 Rebbie, Jackie, Tito, Jermaine, Latoya, Marlon, Michael, Randy and Janet Jackson singers
 Frank and Jesse James; outlaws
 William and Henry James; authors
 Steve Jobs, co-founder of Apple Computer; and Mona Simpson, novelist
 Kevin, Joe, Nick and Frankie Jonas; musicians 
 Grace and Noel Jones; singer and minister respectively
 Kidada and Rashida Jones; actress/designer and actress/writer/producer, respectively (daughters of Quincy Jones and Peggy Lipton)
 Al Joyner and Jackie Joyner-Kersee; Olympic athletes
 Wynonna and Ashley Judd; singer and actress (respectively), daughters of Naomi Judd
 Krystal and Jessica Jung; singers

K
 Michael and Garson Kanin; stage and film writer-directors
 Kourtney, Kim, Khloe, and Rob Kardashian; Television Personalities 
 Stacy and James Keach; actors
 Jason and Travis Kelce; football players 
 John, Robert and Ted Kennedy; politicians
 Caroline and John F. Kennedy Jr.; children of U. S. President John F. Kennedy and Jacqueline Kennedy Onassis
 Tom Kennedy and Jack Narz; both game show hosts, at one point having as a brother-in-law another game show host, Bill Cullen
 Jamie and Patsy Kensit; actors
 Nicole and Antonia Kidman; actress and TV personality, respectively
 Regina and Reina King; actresses 
 Jonathan and Jordan Knight; singers, members of New Kids on the Block
 Mark and David Knopfler; musicians, members of Dire Straits
 Beyoncé and Solange Knowles; singers
 Misono and Kumi Koda; singers
 Martin and Chris Kratt; television hosts
 Sid and Marty Krofft; television producers
 Karen and Michelle Kwan; figure skaters
 Raymond, Thomas and Walter Kwok; chairmen of Sun Hung Kai Properties

L
 Terry and Bobby Labonte; NASCAR Drivers
 Katia and Marielle Labèque; pianists
 Patrick Labyorteaux and Matthew Laborteaux; actors
 Nick and Drew Lachey; singers, members of 98 Degrees
 James and Stuart Lafferty; actors
 Ann Landers (Esther Pauline "Eppie" Lederer) and Abigail van Buren (Pauline Esther "Popo" Philips); advice columnists, identical twins
 Michael and Brian Laudrup; football (soccer) players
 Matthew and Mitchell Laurance; actors, identical twins
 Joey, Matthew and Andrew Lawrence; actors
 Brandon and Shannon Lee; actors, children of martial arts-actor Bruce Lee
 Roger and Sugar Ray Leonard; professional boxers
 Gerald and Sean Levert; singers, members of LeVert
 Spike and Joie Lee; producers, actors
 Stan Lee and Larry Lieber; comic book artists
 Donovan Leitch and Ione Skye; actors, children of Donovan
 Daniel and Sarah Levy; actors, children of Eugene Levy
 Damian and Gareth Lewis; actor/producer and writer/director, respectively
 Pia Lindström (television journalist) and Isabella Rossellini (actress); half-sisters, daughters of Ingrid Bergman
 Laura and Lisa Ling; journalists 
 Robyn and Jason Lively; actors, half-siblings of Blake Lively
 Jamie Lomas and Charley Webb; actors
 Rob and Chad Lowe; actors
 Erik and Magnus Lund; rugby union players
 Loretta Lynn and Crystal Gayle; singer-songwriters

M
 Marcus Gunnarsen and Martinus Gunnarsen;hollywood singers of Norway
 Aleksei Miranchuk and Anton Miranchuk; football players of Lokomotive Moscow
 Benji Madden and Joel Madden; members of Good Charlotte	
 Michael and Virginia Madsen; actors
 Tom and Ray Magliozzi; radio hosts
 Ron and Paul Magers; journalists 
 Costas and Louis Mandylor; actors, martial artists
 Herman and Joseph L. Mankiewicz; screenwriter and writer-director, respectively
 Heinrich and Thomas Mann; novelists
 Cooper, Peyton, and Eli Manning; American football players, sons of Archie Manning
 Kate and Rooney Mara; actresses
 Vanessa and Laura Marano; actresses
 Athan and Constantine Maroulis; singers, actors
 Branford, Wynton, Delfeayo and Jason Marsalis; jazz trumpeter/composer, saxophonist, trombonist, and drummer, respectively; children of jazz pianist Ellis Marsalis Jr.
 Garry and Penny Marshall; motion picture actors/directors
 Julius (Groucho), Arthur (Harpo), Leonard (Chico), Milton (Gummo) and Herbert (Zeppo Marx); vaudeville and film comedians - The Marx Brothers
 Christopher and Kyle Massey; actors and rappers 
 Danny and Christopher Masterson; actors 
 Albert and David Maysles; documentary filmmakers
 Floyd, Roger, and Jeff Mayweather; professional boxers
 Darius and Donovan McCrary; actors and singers
 John and Patrick McEnroe; tennis players
 Danica and Crystal McKellar; actresses
 Philip and Nancy McKeon; actors
 Shane McMahon and Stephanie McMahon-Levesque; Executive Employees for World Wrestling Entertainment
 Jimmy and Kristy McNichol; actors and singers
 Fanny and Felix Mendelssohn; composers
 Alyson and Amanda Michalka; singers and actresses
 Mads and Lars Mikkelsen; actors
 Hayley and Juliet Mills; actresses 
 Liza Minnelli and Lorna Luft; actress-singers, half-sisters, daughters of Judy Garland
 Kylie and Dannii Minogue; singers
 Joan and Arthur Miller; actress and playwright/essayist
 Scott, Clint, Bob and Dave Moffatt; musicians
 Marilyn Monroe and Berniece Baker Miracle; actress/model/singer and writer, half-sisters, daughters of Gladys Pearl Baker
 Carlos and Ricardo Montalbán; actors
 Mark and Bob Mothersbaugh; musicians, members of Devo
 Tia Mowry, Tamera Mowry, and Tahj Mowry; actors
 Richard and Robert Mulligan; actor and motion picture-director, respectively
 Jamie and Andy Murray; tennis players
 Brian Doyle-Murray, Bill Murray, and Joel Murray; writer/actor actor and actor, respectively
 Charlie and Eddie Murphy; actors and comedians
 Roger Mears and Rick Mears; race car drivers

N
 Jack Narz and Tom Kennedy; game show hosts
 James and David Naughton; actors
 Art, Charles, Aaron, and Cyril Neville; musicians, singers
 Gary and Phil Neville; (English football players)
 Fayard and Harold Nicholas; tap dancers (see also Nicholas Brothers)
 Rob and Scott Niedermayer; hockey players
 Christopher Nolan and Jonathan Nolan; director/writer/producer and writer, respectively
 Linda, Bernie and Coleen Nolan; singers
 Jack Noseworthy and Katie Wright; actors
 Jeni and Kyndi Niquette; actresses, lifestyle models, members of the pop rock duo Jen and Kat

O
 Austin and Trevor O'Brien; actors
 Finneas O'Connell and Billie Eilish; musician/actor and singer, respectively
 Jerry and Charlie O'Connell; actors
 Catherine O'Hara and Mary Margaret O'Hara; actress and singer-songwriter, respectively
 Tatum, Griffin and Patrick O'Neal; actors, children of Ryan O'Neal
 Eric Christian Olsen and Susan Olsen; actors
 Mary-Kate, Ashley, and Elizabeth Olsen; actors/fashion moguls; actor
 Haley Joel and Emily Osment; actors
 Alan Wayne Merrill Jay  Donny Marie and Jimmy Osmond; singers
 Nash and Chord Overstreet, guitarist and actor/singer, children of Paul Overstreet

P
 Manny and Bobby Pacquiao; professional boxers and politicians 
 Gwyneth and Jake Paltrow; actress and director, respectively; children of Blythe Danner and Bruce Paltrow
 Kay and Danielle Panabaker; actors
 Hayden and Jansen Panettiere; actors
 James and John Pankow; trombonist and actor, respectively
 Dolly Parton, Stella Parton, Randy Parton and Rachel Dennison; country singers
 Freda and Scherrie Payne; singers
 Anthony and Candace Parker; basketball players
 Logan and Jake Paul; social media personalities
 Jim and John Paxson; basketball players
 Irving and Arthur Penn; photographer and stage/film director, respectively
 Sean, Chris and Michael Penn; actors and musician, respectively
 Chuck and Wesley Person; basketball players
 Chris and Pat Petersen; actors
 Vicky and Debbi Peterson; singers, musicians, composers, members of The Bangles
 Michelle and Dedee Pfeiffer; actresses
 River, Rain, Joaquin, Liberty and Summer Phoenix; actors
Jack, Lottie, and Mary Pickford; actor, and actresses.
 Ruth, Anita, Bonnie, and June Pointer; singers, members of The Pointer Sisters
 Jeff, Mike, and Steve Porcaro; musicians
 AJ and Curtis Pritchard; dancers

Q
 Dennis and Randy Quaid; actors

R
 Joe and Jerome Ranft; 
 Laird Macintosh and Heather Rattray; actors
 Vanessa, Lynn and Corin Redgrave; actors, children of actor Sir Michael Redgrave
 Jim and William Reid; musicians, in The Jesus and Mary Chain
 Fernand, Louis and Marcel Renault; industrialists, founders of Renault
 Simon and Phillip Rhee; martial arts-actors
 Maurice and Henri Richard; hockey players
 Kim and Kyle Richards; actors, half sisters to Kathy Avanzino Richards Hilton
 Natasha and Joely Richardson; actresses, daughters of Vanessa Redgrave and Tony Richardson
 Eric and Julia Roberts; actors
 Chris and Rich Robinson; musicians, members of The Black Crowes
 Chris and Tony Rock actors & comedians
 Abby (philanthropist), John D. III (philanthropist), Nelson (governor/41st U.S. vice-president), Laurance (financier/philanthropist/conservationist), Winthrop (governor/philanthropist), and David Rockefeller (banker); children of John D. Rockefeller Jr.
 Christophe and Olivier Rochus; Belgian tennis players
 Evan and Tracee Ellis Ross; actors, children of Diana Ross
 Windham and Taylor Rotunda - professional wrestlers
 Jimmy and David Ruffin  singers

S
 Marat Safin and Dinara Safina; Russian (ethnic Tatar) tennis players
 Katey, Joe and twins Jean and Liz Sagal; actors, children of director Boris Sagal
 Emilio, Javier Sánchez and Arantxa Sánchez Vicario; Spanish tennis players
 Carlos and Jorge Santana; guitarists, musicians
 Fred, Kala and Ben Savage; actors
 Nadia and Julia Sawalha; actresses, daughters of actor Nadim Sawalha
 Maria and Maximilian Schell; actors, cousins of Catherine Schell
 Michael and Ralf Schumacher; Formula One drivers
 Jason and Robert Schwartzman; actors, musicians, sons of Talia Shire, grandsons of Carmine Coppola
 Drew and Jonathan Scott; realtors
 Ridley and Tony Scott; motion picture-directors
 David and Amy Sedaris; author and actress, respectively
 Gráinne and Síle Seoige; television presenters
 Sterling and Shannon Sharpe; former American football players
 Christopher, Stephen and Eric Shea; actors
Athole, Douglas and Norma Shearer; actress, MGM film sound engineer, actress (respectively)
 Elisabeth and Andrew Shue; actors
 Casey and Nina Siemaszko; actors
 Carly, Lucy and Joanna Simon; singer-songwriter composer journalist, respectively 
 Jessica and Ashlee Simpson; singers, actresses
 Marc and Lori Singer; actors
 Tom and Jeffrey Skilling; meteorologist and CEO, respectively
 Sócrates and Raí Souza Vieira de Oliveira; Brazilian international footballers
 Tom and Dick Smothers; musicians, comedians The Smothers Brothers
 Britney and Jamie Lynn Spears; singers, actresses
 Tori and Randy Spelling; actors, children of TV magnate Aaron Spelling
 Leon and Michael Spinks; professional boxers
 Bruce and Pamela Springsteen; rock impresario and actress, respectively
 Sylvester and Frank Stallone; actors and musician, respectively 
 Rick and Scott Steiner; professional wrestlers (see also The Steiner Brothers)
 Lennon and Maisy Stella; singers and actresses
 Amy and Ben Stiller; actors
 Rider and Shiloh Strong; actors
 Guy and Dean Stockwell; actors
 Sly, Rose, Freddie and Vet Stone; musicians, Sly & the Family Stone
 Barbra Streisand and Roslyn Kind; singer, actress and singer
 Masao and Naoto Suenaga; drifting drivers, competes in D1 Grand Prix
 Rose and Ottilie Sutro; American piano duo
 Patrick and Don Swayze; actors
 Taylor and Austin Swift; singer and actor, respectively

T
 Constance, Natalie and Norma Talmadge; actors
 Larron, Lahmard and Larenz Tate; actors & producer writer respectively
 Gillian and Kim Taylforth; actresses
 Benedict and Femi Taylor (adopted); actors
 Niki and Krissy Taylor; supermodels
 Ryan and Adam Thomas; actors
 Meg and Jennifer Tilly; actors
 Kara and Hannah Tointon; actresses
 Frank and Joe Torre; baseball players
 Joe and Guy Torry; actors comedians 
 Kolo Touré and Yaya Touré; footballers from Côte d'Ivoire
 Joey and John Travolta; actors
 Joan and Valerie Trimble; piano duo
 John and Nicholas Turturro; actors

U
 Rory and Tony Underwood; English rugby union wingers

V
 Dick and Jerry Van Dyke; actors
 Vincent and Theo van Gogh; artist and art dealer, respectively
 Alex and Eddie Van Halen; musicians, members of Van Halen
 Dick, Joyce and Timothy Van Patten; actors (Tim is also a director)
 James and Vincent Van Patten; actors, sons of actor Dick Van Patten
 Ronnie Van Zant, Donnie Van Zant and Johnny Van Zant; Musicians
 Stevie Ray and Jimmie Vaughan; musicians

W
 Donnie and Mark Wahlberg; singers, actors
 Kenny, Mike and Rusty Wallace; NASCAR Drivers
 Darrell NASCAR Broadcaster and Michael Waltrip NASCAR Sprint Cup Drivers Daytona 500 Champions
 J. J., Derek and T. J. Watt; football players
 Gerard Way and Mikey Way; members of My Chemical Romance
 Keenen Ivory, Damon, Shawn, and Marlon Wayans; actor-writer-comedians
 Harvey and Bob Weinstein;  film producers 
 John and Charles Wesley; English cleric and hymn writer
 Maurice, Fred and Verdine White; musicians, members of Earth, Wind and Fire
 Kai and Theo Widdrington; dancer and footballer, respectively
 Dominique and Gerald Wilkins; basketball players
 Vanessa and Chris Williams; actors 
 Venus and Serena Williams; tennis players
 Andrew, Owen and Luke Wilson; actors
 Ann and Nancy Wilson; singers, musicians, members of Heart
 Carnie and Wendy Wilson; singers, members of Wilson Phillips, daughters of Brian Wilson
 Brian, Dennis, and Carl Wilson; musicians, founding members of The Beach Boys
 Ricky and Cindy Wilson; composers, musicians, singers, members of The B-52's
 Jeff and Michael Wincott; actors
 Cameron and Tyler Winklevoss; entrepreneurs
 Edgar and Johnny Winter; musicians
 Rob and Richard Witschge; football players
 Paul and Ludwig Wittgenstein; concert pianist and philosopher, respectively
 Natalie and Lana Wood; actors
 Wilbur and Orville Wright; inventors

X

Y

 Malcolm, George, and Angus Young; musicians, members of AC/DC
 John Savage; Robin, Gail and Jim Youngs; actors

Z
 Lisa and Billy Zane; actors
 Moon, Dweezil, Ahmet and Diva Zappa; musicians, actors; children of Gail and Frank Zappa
 Madeline, Yvonne and Vanessa Zima; actors
 David and Jerry Zucker; motion picture-writers and directors

See also
List of coupled siblings
List of show business families
List of U.S. political families

pairs
Lists of pairs